Westcliff Rugby Football Club is an English rugby union team based in Eastwood, a suburb of Southend-on-Sea in Essex. The club runs four senior teams and the full range of junior teams. The men's 1st XV currently play in National League 2 East, the fourth tier of the English rugby union system, following their promotion via the play-offs from London & South East Premier at the end of the 2018–19 season. The club was formed in 1922 as Old Westcliffians Rugby Football Club, for ex-pupils of Westcliff High School and took the current name of Westcliff Rugby Club in the 1990s.

Honours
Eastern Counties 2 South champions: 2002–03
Essex 1 champions: 2003–04
London Division 3 North East champions: 2007–08
London Division 1 North champions (2): 2010–11, 2013–14
LSE Premier v SW Premier promotion play-off winners: 2018–19

Current standings

See also
 Essex RFU

References

External links
Official club website

English rugby union teams
Rugby clubs established in 1922
Sports clubs in Southend-on-Sea
Rugby union clubs in Essex